The New Zealand national cricket team toured India and played three Test matches and five Limited Overs Internationals (LOI) between September and November 1999.

Squads

Test series

1st Test

2nd Test

3rd Test

One Day Internationals (ODIs)

1st ODI

2nd ODI

3rd ODI

4th ODI

5th ODI

References

External links

1999 in Indian cricket
1999 in New Zealand cricket
1999
International cricket competitions from 1997–98 to 2000
Indian cricket seasons from 1970–71 to 1999–2000